Dmytro Zhdankov (born 18 November 1984) is a professional Ukrainian football goalkeeper. He is the product of the Metalist Youth School system.

Career 
Raised in Metalist Youth School system, Dmytro Zhdankov failed to find a regular spot in the Metalist Reserves and thus in the beginning of 2003 moved to the Ukrainian Second League club FC Hazovyk-KhGV Kharkiv, where he found a regular spot and played there for until the winter of 2007–08 season when the removed themselves from competition. So, Zhdankov returned to his home club to continue playing for the Metalist Reserve squad for the rest of the season. For the 2008–09 season, Metalist coach Myron Markevych named him to be one of the three main goalies of the senior club.

National Team 
During the 2002–2003 season, Dmytro Zhdankov was called up to Ukrainian under-19 national football team, where he played one game.

External links 
 Official Website Profile
Profile on EUFO
Profile on FootballSquads

Ukrainian footballers
FC Metalist Kharkiv players
FC Olimpik Donetsk players
Ukrainian Premier League players
Association football goalkeepers
1984 births
Living people
Footballers from Kharkiv